The  Chicago Slaughter season was the team's fifth season as a professional indoor football franchise and first in the Indoor Football League (IFL). One of twenty-five teams competing in the IFL for the 2010 season, the Hoffman Estates, Illinois-based Chicago Slaughter were members of the Central North Division of the United Conference.

Under the leadership of owner Jim McMahon, and head coach Steve McMichael, the team played their home games at the Sears Centre in Hoffman Estates, Illinois.

Schedule

Regular season

Playoffs

Roster

Standings

References

Chicago Slaughter
Chicago Slaughter seasons
2010 in sports in Illinois